Caus or Kaous was a settlement in ancient Arcadia, a region of the southern part of Greece located on the Peloponnese peninsula. When Pausanias visited the area in the 2nd century, the place was already ruined. It was situated in the territory of the city Thelpusa, 40 stadia from Thelpusa and 25 stadia from the river Arsen (Άρσην). There was a sanctuary of Asclepius.  Its site is unlocated.

References 

Arcadian city-states
Populated places in ancient Arcadia
Former populated places in Greece
Lost ancient cities and towns